Rajya Sabha elections were held on various dates in 1987, to elect members of the Rajya Sabha, Indian Parliament's upper chamber.

Elections
Elections were held to elect members from various states.

Members elected
The following members are elected in the elections held in 1987. They are members for the term 1987-1993 and retire in year 1993, except in case of the resignation or death before the term.
The list is incomplete.

State - Member - Party

Bye-elections
The following bye elections were held in the year 1987.

State - Member - Party

 Nagaland -  S. C. Jamir - INC ( ele  02/07/1987 term till 1992 ) res 02/02/1989 CM, NG
 Haryana - Om Prakash Chautala - JD ( ele  14/08/1987 term till 1990 )
 Andhra pradesh -  M K Rehman - TDP ( ele  05/10/1987 term till 1988 )

References

1987 elections in India
1987